"Wasted Years" is an Iron Maiden song

Wasted Years may also refer to:

Music

Albums
Wasted Years (Sons of Song album), 1960 gospel male voice trio album
Wasted Years, 2001 compilation album of The Sensational Nightingales
Wasted Years (album) 2014 album by Off!
Wasted Years, 2012 album by Infinity (band)

Songs
""Wasted Years" (Wally Fowler song), gospel song, signature song of The Sensational Nightingales, recorded by Jimmy Swaggart and others
"Wasted Years", Maroon 5 song on Live – Friday the 13th album
"Wasted Years", song written by Phil Driscoll and recorded by Joe Cocker on the 1978 album Luxury You Can Afford